The Steinhatchee River is a short river in the Big Bend region of Florida in the United States. The river rises in the Mallory Swamp just south of Mayo in Lafayette County and flows for  out of Lafayette County, forming the boundary between Dixie County and Taylor County to the Gulf of Mexico. The river has also been known as the Hittenhatchee, Esteenhatchee and Isteenhatchee.

The only communities along the river are Steinhatchee and Jena near its mouth. The river is not developed, being used solely for recreation and as a port for landings of locally caught commercial fishes such as sheepshead, mullet, gag and red grouper, Spanish mackerel, white grunt, hogfish, stone crab, and blue crab. About  of the river goes underground as a subterranean river near where U.S. Route 19 crosses the river.  from the river's mouth is Steinhatchee Falls, where the river drops several feet.

See also
Steinhatchee Rise, an area of protected land that includes the rise
Steinhatchee Falls, an area of protected land that includes the falls

References

Marth, Del. 1990. Steinhatchee River. in Marth, Del and Marty Marth, eds. The Rivers of Florida. Sarasota, Florida: Pineapple Press, Inc. .

Bodies of water of Dixie County, Florida
Bodies of water of Lafayette County, Florida
Rivers of Florida
Rivers of Taylor County, Florida
Subterranean rivers of the United States